Moritz Adam (born 6 October 1999) is a German sprint canoeist.

He won a medal at the 2019 ICF Canoe Sprint World Championships.

References

1999 births
Living people
German male canoeists
ICF Canoe Sprint World Championships medalists in Canadian
Canoeists from Berlin